Åke Hedvall  (9 April 1910 – 7 April 1969) was a Swedish discus thrower. He was born in Västerfärnebo.

He competed at the 1936 Summer Olympics in Berlin, where he placed 8th in the final.

References

External links

1910 births
1969 deaths
Swedish male discus throwers
Athletes (track and field) at the 1936 Summer Olympics
Olympic athletes of Sweden